Emmanuel Emangoa  (born 16 June 1977) is a Cameroonian footballer, currently playing in Israel for Hapoel Ashkelon.

References

1983 births
Living people
Cameroonian footballers
Hapoel Ashkelon F.C. players
Hapoel Ironi Kiryat Shmona F.C. players
Maccabi Ironi Kiryat Ata F.C. players
Hapoel Acre F.C. players
Expatriate footballers in Israel
Association football forwards
Israeli Premier League players